Andrew Crowell (born 15 August 1977) is a former Australian rules footballer who played in the Australian Football League. He played 44 games with Adelaide before rupturing his ACL while playing in the SANFL.  He was delisted at the end of the 2003 season.

After working with the Adelaide Crows post retirement he was involved in the AFL Foundation Ladder program, which aims to fight youth homelessness. 

Then after working with the AFL Players Association, Andrew accepted a role with the Brisbane Lions Football Club, as Head of Personal Excellence & Wellbeing.

References

External links

Adelaide Football Club players
Woodville-West Torrens Football Club players
Australian rules footballers from South Australia
1977 births
Living people